The College of Agriculture, Latur is a Government college located along the Nanded Road in Latur, Maharashtra, India.

External links

 
 Agriculture College, Latur at wikimapia
 College Of Agriculture Latur
 College of Agriculture, Latur

Education in Latur
Agricultural universities and colleges in Maharashtra
Educational institutions established in 1987
1987 establishments in Maharashtra